Tylko Rock (Only Rock) was a monthly hobby magazine published in Poland from 1991 until 2003. Focusing exclusively on rock music, Tylko Rock was founded in September 1991, by Wiesław Królikowski and Wiesław Weiss. A total of 134 issues were published over the next dozen years. Some of Poland's leading musicians and music journalists contributed articles during the publication's run. In 2003, Tylko Rock was relaunched as Teraz Rock (Now Rock), with the magazine expanding its coverage to other genres of music when appropriate.

References

1991 establishments in Poland
2003 disestablishments in Poland
Defunct magazines published in Poland
Magazines established in 1991
Magazines disestablished in 2003
Music magazines
Magazines published in Poland
Polish-language magazines
Monthly magazines published in Poland